Joseph A. Miller (February 17, 1861 – April 23, 1928) was an American Major League Baseball player born in Baltimore, Maryland, who played shortstop for two seasons, one for the  Toledo Blue Stockings and the other for the  Louisville Colonels.  He had a career batting average of .214 in 203 total games played.

Miller died in Wheeling, West Virginia at the age of 67, and is interred at Mount Calvary Cemetery in Wheeling.

References

External links

1861 births
1928 deaths
Baseball players from Baltimore
Major League Baseball shortstops
19th-century baseball players
Toledo Blue Stockings players
Louisville Colonels players
Toledo Blue Stockings (minor league) players
Savannah (minor league baseball) players
LaCrosse Freezers players
Omaha Omahogs players
Omaha Lambs players
Minneapolis Millers (baseball) players
St. Paul Apostles players
Duluth Whalebacks players
Bozeman Irrigators players